The Philippine Rowing Association is the national governing body for rowing in the Philippines. It is accredited by the Fédération Internationale des Sociétés d'Aviron (FISA) or International Rowing Federation which is the governing body for the sport of rowing in the world.

External links
Philippine Rowing Association profile at the Philippine Olympic Committee website

Philippines
Rowing in the Philippines
Rowing